Andirá River may refer to the following rivers in Brazil:

 Andirá River (Amazon River tributary)
 Andirá River (Acre River tributary)
 Andirá River (Juruá River tributary)
 Andirá River (Tapajós River tributary)

See also
 Andra River (disambiguation)